Alexander Field is a baseball venue based in Blythe, California, United States.  It is home to a professional baseball team, the Arizona Winter League's Blythe Heat.

External links
 Slideshow: Blythe Heat - 2008 Winter League Champions Palo Verde/Quartzsite Times, August 5, 2008
 Arizona Winter League website

Minor league baseball venues
Baseball venues in California
Sports venues in Riverside County, California
Blythe, California